Rhian Denise Ramos Howell (born October 3, 1990), professionally known as Rhian Ramos, is a Filipino actress, commercial model, singer, host and race car driver.

Career
Ramos started working in commercials including McDonald's Philippines McJelly Trio. Her first television series was  Captain Barbell in 2006, and a year later she was part of Lupin. She has played the lead role in My Only Love.

In 2007, Ramos had her film debut in The Promise in which she won her first Golden Screen Award for Breakthrough Performance by an Actress. She also starred in the horror film Ouija. In 2008, Ramos was chosen to host Pinoy Idol Extra, the daily update edition of Pinoy Idol. Ramos also starred in two Philippine dramas, Codename: Asero,  and in LaLola, a remake of the 2007 Argentine television comedy telenovela of the same name.  By the end of the year, Ramos finished two feature films, My Monster Mom and I.T.A.L.Y.. LaLola ended in February 2009. She starred in the suspense-thriller film Sundo that came out the following month. In 2009, she starred in two Philippine dramas: Zorro and Stairway to Heaven.

Ramos released her debut dance-music album Audition Dance Battle under Universal Records in partnership with Bellhaus Entertainment. Ramos starred in the fantasy film Ang Panday. She is the muse of the B-Meg Llamados for the 2011–2012 season of the Philippine Basketball Association.

In 2015, Ramos played the lead role in the television series The Rich Man's Daughter as Jade Tanchingco, alongside Glaiza de Castro who played Ramos' love interest.

In 2018, it was announced that Ramos would be the lead in the Manila-set independent film Empty by Design starring alongside Australian actor Chris Pang and Canadian actor Osric Chau.

Filmography

Acting performances in television dramas

Anthology

Comedy

Hosting

Television Film

Acting performances in film

Modelling

Poetry book

Discography

Singles

Music videos

Awards

References

External links

GMA Network profile

1990 births
Living people
Filipino child actresses
Filipino film actresses
Filipino television actresses
People from Makati
Actresses from Metro Manila
21st-century Filipino actresses
Filipino people of British descent
GMA Network personalities
Filipino television presenters
Filipino television variety show hosts